Syon House  is the west London residence of the Duke of Northumberland.  A Grade I listed building, it lies within the 200-acre (80 hectare) Syon Park, in the London Borough of Hounslow.

The family's traditional central London residence had been Northumberland House, now demolished. The eclectic interior of Syon House was designed by the architect Robert Adam in the 1760s.

History 

Syon House derives its name from Syon Abbey, a medieval monastery of the Bridgettine Order, founded in 1415 on a nearby site by King Henry V. The abbey moved to the site now occupied by Syon House in 1431. It was one of the wealthiest nunneries in the country and a local legend recites that the monks of Sheen had a ley tunnel running to the nunnery at Syon. In 1539, the abbey was closed by royal agents during the Dissolution of the Monasteries and the monastic community was expelled.

Upon the dissolution of the abbey, Syon became the property of the Crown for a short time before long lease to the 1st Duke of Somerset, who had the site rebuilt as Syon House in the Italian Renaissance style before his death in 1552. In 1541 and through February 1542, Henry VIII's fifth wife, Catherine Howard, was imprisoned at Syon. In February 1542, the King's men took her to the Tower of London and executed her on charges of adultery. Five years later, when King Henry VIII died, his coffin, surmounted by a jewelled effigy, rested at Syon House for one night before the procession continued to his burial place in St George's Chapel, Windsor.

Lady Jane Grey was living in the house in July 1553 with her husband when she received news that she was to become Queen.

In 1557, it was proposed to convert the new building to the earlier Catholic use but Elizabeth I of England acceded to the throne before this change was effected. Syon was acquired in 1594 by Henry Percy, 9th Earl of Northumberland (1564–1632) since when it has remained in his family.

In 1609, Thomas Harriot was working at Syon when he made the first ever use of the newly invented telescope to make astronomical drawings of the moon on 26 June, several months ahead of Galileo's observations. A plaque marking Harriot can be found in the grounds, not far from where the observations took place.

In the late 17th century, Syon was in the possession of Charles Seymour, 6th Duke of Somerset, through his wife, Elizabeth Seymour (née Percy). After the future Queen Anne had a disagreement with her sister, Mary II (wife of William III, also known as William of Orange), over her friendship with Sarah Churchill, Countess of Marlborough, Queen Mary evicted Princess Anne from her court residence at Whitehall and Hampton Court. Princess Anne came to live at Syon with her close friends, the Somersets, in 1692. Anne gave birth to a stillborn child there. Shortly after the birth, Queen Mary came to visit her, again demanding that Anne dismiss the Countess of Marlborough and stormed out again when Anne flatly refused.

In the 18th century, Hugh Percy, 1st Duke of Northumberland, commissioned architect and interior designer Robert Adam and landscape designer Lancelot "Capability" Brown to redesign the house and estate. Work began on the interior reconstruction project in 1762. Five large rooms on the west, south and east sides of the House, were completed before work ceased in 1769. A central rotunda, which Adam had intended for the interior courtyard space, was not implemented, due to cost.

In 1951, Syon House was opened to the public for the first time under the 10th Duke and Duchess.  Later, in 1995 under the 12th Duke, the family rooms became open to the public as well.  As the Percy family continues to live there, they continue to enhance the house. Most recently the Duchess added a new central courtyard with the design of Marchioness of Salisbury.

A £600K restoration was undertaken in late 2007, primarily involving work to the roof area.  In 2008 restoration work commenced on the Great Hall and a current long-term project is to restore the Adam Rooms.

Architecture 

Syon House's exterior was erected in 1547 while under the ownership of the 1st Duke of Somerset.  Syon's current interior was designed by Robert Adam in 1762 under the commission of the 1st Duke and Duchess of Northumberland.

The well known "Adam style" is said to have begun with Syon House. It was commissioned to be built in the Neo-classical style, which was fulfilled, but Adam's eclectic style doesn't end there. Syon is filled with multiple styles and inspirations including a huge influence of Roman antiquity, highly visible Romantic, Picturesque, Baroque and Mannerist styles and a dash of Gothic. There is also evidence in his decorative motifs of his influence by Pompeii that he received while studying in Italy.  Adam's plan of Syon House included a complete set of rooms on the main floor, a domed rotunda with a circular inner colonnade meant for the main courtyard ('meant for' meaning that this rotunda was not built due to a lack of funds), five main rooms on the west, east and south side of the building, a pillared ante-room famous for its colour, a Great Hall, a grand staircase (though not built as grand as originally designed) and a Long Gallery stretching 136 feet long.  Adam's most famous addition is the suite of state rooms and as such they remain exactly as they were built.

More specific to the interior of Adam's rooms is where the elaborate detail and colour shines through.  Adam added detailed marble chimneypieces, shuttering doors and doorways in the Drawing Room, along with fluted columns with Corinthian capitals.  The long gallery, which is about 14 feet high and 14 feet wide, contains many recesses and niches into the thick wall for books along with rich and light decoration and stucco-covered walls and ceiling.  At the end of the gallery is a closet with a domed circle supported by eight columns; halfway through the columns is a doorway imitating a niche.

In the 1820s the north range of the house that was not completed by Adam was redesigned by the 3rd Duke. At this time the house was also refaced in Bath stone and the porch rebuilt.  This remodelling is thought to have been done by the architect Thomas Cady, who had worked on other estates belonging to the Percy family.

Syon House was refurbished again in the 1860s.  The 4th Duke had Renaissance-style plaster ceilings put into the Family Drawing Room, Family Dining Room and Print Room.

The final plan of Syon House includes an entrance hall, ante-room, State Dining Room, State Drawing Room, Long Gallery, study, sitting room, Print Room, Family Drawing Room, Family Dining Room, private apartments on the top floor for the family to live in and a grand staircase.

Syon Park 

Syon Park is a 200-acre (80 hectare) park bordering the Thames, looking across the river to Kew Gardens.  Near its banks is a tidal meadow flooded twice a day by the river. It contains more than 200 species of rare trees. Although the park and lake were designed by Capability Brown in 1760, their character today is nineteenth century. The circular pool has a copy of Giambologna's Mercury.  The park and the house in the background were painted from across the Thames by J. M. W. Turner c. 1802–1810 in the painting Zion House, Isleworth and in two capriccios in 1805.

The Great Conservatory in the gardens, designed by Charles Fowler in the 1820s and completed in 1827, was the first conservatory to be built from metal and glass on a large scale. The conservatory is Grade I listed.

Henry Percy, 11th Duke of Northumberland, who was head of the family from 1988 to 1995, was noted for planting many trees in the grounds of Syon.

In 2002, the English poet Geoffrey Hill released a booklength poem, The Orchards of Syon, to much acclaim. The Orchards of Syon focuses on the history of the region and in particular on the orchard of rare trees first planted in Syon Abbey.

The London Butterfly House was based in the grounds of Syon Park from 1981 until its closure on 28 October 2007 due to the Duke of Northumberland's plans to build a hotel complex on the land. In 2004, planning permission was granted for the deluxe £35-million Radisson Edwardian Hotel. In 2011, the Syon Park Waldorf Astoria hotel opened on the site. The hotel was renamed to the Hilton London Syon Park in 2013.

Also based in the grounds of Syon Park was the Heritage Motor Museum, a collection of vintage cars, which was also founded in 1981. Owing to a major increase in the number of vehicles acquired, in 1993 the museum closed and its collection was transferred to the Heritage Motor Centre at Gaydon in Warwickshire. Before that, Syon House was host to the London Transport Collection after the closure of the Clapham museum and prior to its move to Covent Garden in 1980.

In 2002 an annual archaeological dig was initiated, originally by the Channel 4 television Time Team programme, to excavate the remains of the lost abbey. The annual dig is now undertaken by Birkbeck College part of the University of London. It is backed up by a permanent exhibition in the undercroft.

In November 2010, the results from an archaeological dig made two years before on the site of the new hotel were reported, with the excavations uncovering the remains of a Roman village that existed in what was then the rural outskirts of Londinium. Artefacts uncovered included 11,500 pottery fragments, 100 coins and pieces of jewellery. Some of the finds remain unexplained, such as the discovery of skeletons "buried in ditches placed on their side". Although the skeletons date from the Roman period, this burial practice was said by the senior archaeologist to be "more suggestive of unknown prehistoric rites than Roman practice".

Syon Park is a Site of Special Scientific Interest and Grade I listed.

In popular culture
The house and garden have been used for filming including: Endeavour; Poirot; Dancing on the Edge; Byron; The Devil's Jest (1954); Bedazzled; Fall of Eagles; The Lost Prince; The Young Visiters; Longitude; Looking for Victoria; Daniel Deronda; Wives and Daughters; Love in a Cold Climate; Gosford Park; The Madness of King George; King Ralph; The Wings of the Dove; Emma; The Golden Bowl; The Avengers; Killing Eve Belgravia; Bridgerton; Bedazzled; Catch Us If You Can (1965); Bhaji on the Beach (1993) and The Cure's 1984 single "The Caterpillar".

Gallery

See also 
 Alnwick Castle, the principal seat of the Dukes of Northumberland
 Hounslow parks and open spaces
 List of Sites of Special Scientific Interest in Greater London
 Northumberland House, the former central London residence of the Dukes of Northumberland
 Treasure Houses of Britain, 1985 television documentary that shows parts of the house

References

Citations

General sources

Further reading 
 Syon House: The Story of a Great House – With a short guide for visitors and with four (colour) plates, two endpaper maps (in colour) and 22 illustrations in monochrome (the illustrations mainly relate to paintings, artefacts and the building). First published by Syon House Estate (UK) in 1950 with 48 pages and no ISBN.  .

External links 

 Syon Park official site
 Syon House entry from The DiCamillo Companion to British & Irish Country Houses
 Aerial photo and map
 Drawings and photos
 A detailed historical record of Syon House

Buildings and structures on the River Thames
Country houses in London
Gardens by Capability Brown
Gardens in London
Grade I listed houses in London
Grade I listed buildings in the London Borough of Hounslow
Grade I listed museum buildings
Historic house museums in London
History of Middlesex
Houses in the London Borough of Hounslow
Middlesex
Museums in the London Borough of Hounslow
Parks and open spaces in the London Borough of Hounslow
Percy family residences